Reid House is a historic home located at Pittsboro, Chatham County, North Carolina.  It was built about 1850, and is a -story, three bay, Federal / Greek Revival style double-pile plan frame dwelling. It has a broad gable roof and two interior chimneys. The house was renovated in the 1930s.

It was listed on the National Register of Historic Places in 1982.  It is located in the Pittsboro Historic District.

References

Houses on the National Register of Historic Places in North Carolina
Federal architecture in North Carolina
Greek Revival houses in North Carolina
Houses completed in 1850
Houses in Chatham County, North Carolina
National Register of Historic Places in Chatham County, North Carolina
Pittsboro, North Carolina
Individually listed contributing properties to historic districts on the National Register in North Carolina